Mines Paris - PSL, officially École nationale supérieure des mines de Paris (until May 2022 Mines ParisTech, also known as École des mines de Paris, ENSMP, Mines de Paris, les Mines, or Paris School of Mines), is a French grande école and a constituent college of PSL Research University. It was originally established in 1783 by King Louis XVI.

Mines Paris is distinguished for the outstanding performance of its research centers and the quality of its international partnerships with other prestigious universities in the world, which include Massachusetts Institute of Technology (MIT), California Institute of Technology (Caltech), Harvard John A. Paulson School of Engineering and Applied Sciences (Harvard SEAS), Shanghai Jiao Tong University, University of Hong Kong, National University of Singapore (NUS), Novosibirsk State University, Pontifical Catholic University of Chile, and Tokyo Tech.

Mines Paris also publishes a world university ranking based on the number of alumni holding the post of CEO in one of the 500 largest companies in the world: the Mines ParisTech: Professional Ranking of World Universities. The school is a member of the ParisTech (Paris Institute of Technology) alliance.

History

A school of mining had been proposed by Henri Bertin in 1765 but it was the chemist Balthazar-Georges Sage who, though not a chemist of repute, was a royalist who was able to influence Jacques Necker (1732–1804) of the value of mineralogy in training students in mining. This was achieved through the use of his own large collections of minerals, and a chair in mineralogy was established on July 11, 1778. The school of mines was begun at the mint, the Hôtel de la Monnaie, Paris. The school was officially opened by decree of the French King's Counsel on March 19, 1783.

The school disappeared at the beginning of the French Revolution but was re-established by decree of the Committee of Public Safety in 1794, the 13th Messidor Year II. It moved to Savoie, after a decree of the consuls the 23rd Pluviôse Year X (1802).

After the Bourbon Restoration in 1814, the school moved to the Hôtel de Vendôme (in the 6th arrondissement in Paris' Jardin du Luxembourg). From the 1960s onwards, it created research laboratories in Fontainebleau, Évry, and Sophia Antipolis (Nice).

Education

École des mines de Paris is a member of the Groupe des écoles des mines (GEM), a group of 8 Institut Mines-Telecom (IMT) engineering schools that are Grandes Écoles, a French institution of higher education that is separate from, but parallel and connected to the main framework of the French public university system. Similar to the Ivy League in the United States, Oxbridge in the UK, and C9 League in China, Grandes Écoles are elite academic institutions that admit students through an extremely competitive process. Alums go on to occupy elite positions within government, administration, and corporate firms in France.

The initial aim of the École des mines de Paris, namely to train high-level mining engineers, evolved with time to adapt to the technological and structural transformations undergone by society. Mines ParisTech has now become one of the most prestigious French engineering schools with a broad variety of subjects. Its students are trained to have management positions, work in research and development departments, or as operations officers, etc. They receive a well-rounded education in a variety of subjects, ranging from the most technical (Mathematics, Physics) to economics, social sciences or even art in order to be able to tackle the managing or engineering-related issues they are to face. Exchange programs are possible during the third semester with prestigious universities around the world, such as Massachusetts Institute of Technology (MIT), California Institute of Technology (Caltech), University of Hong Kong, National University of Singapore (NUS), Tokyo Tech, Seoul National University...

Although the IMT engineering schools are more expensive than public universities in France, Grandes Écoles typically have much smaller class sizes and student bodies, and many of their programs are taught in English. International internships, study abroad opportunities, and close ties with government and the corporate world are a hallmark of the Grandes Écoles. Many of the top ranked schools in Europe are members of the Conférence des Grandes Écoles (CGE), as are the IMT engineering schools. Degrees from the IMT are accredited by the Conférence des Grandes Écoles and awarded by the Ministry of National Education (France).

Mines ParisTech provides different educational paths:

The Ingénieurs civils degree (Master of Science and Executive Engineering), ranked among the best French grandes écoles engineering degrees, similar to that offered at École polytechnique, École des Ponts ParisTech and CentraleSupélec.
The Corps of Mines, one of the greatest technical corps of the French state. It is a third cycle degree, lasting for three years, consisting in two long-term internships both in public and private economical institutions and courses in economics and public institutions. The admission to the Corps des Mines is highly selective as only the top students from École polytechnique, École normale supérieure, Mines ParisTech and Telecom Paris may apply.
Mastère Spécialisé degree, (post-graduate specialization degree) post-graduate programs accredited by the Conférence des Grandes écoles, in the fields of Energy, Environment, Transport and Logistics, Informatics, Safety and management in industry and Materials engineering.
Doctoral (19 schools) and Master (9 programs) studies in various fields.

For students having studied in the Classe Préparatoire aux Grandes Ecoles (a two-year highly selective undergraduate program in Mathematics, Physics and Engineering, among others), admission to Civil Engineer of Mines is decided through a nationwide competitive examination. Every year, ten applications are also accepted from students around the world according to their academic achievements.

Admission to the Corps of Mines is possible for French students at the end of the studies in École polytechnique, École normale supérieure, École des télécommunications de Paris and École des mines de Paris (these two later, after a specific examination), or from the other great technical corps of the French state. Admission in third year is also open to one Ph.D graduate.

Rankings

National ranking (ranked as Mines Paris for its Master of Sciences in Engineering)

Student unions and organizations
A Student Union is elected every year after a one-week campaign, and is in charge of enhancing the contact between students and various sponsoring industries as well as organizing events for the students.
 
Various other organizations are part of students' lives: the Students' Sport Committee (BDS), the Junior Enterprise (JUMP), the Arts' Office (BDA), Cahier Vert (social opening and tutoring), CAV (wine-tasting club), Catholic community, fanfare band, entrepreneur club (Mines Genius), humanitarian organizations (Heliotopia, Ceres, Zanbinou), photography club, and sailing club, among others.

Alumni

Academics & Scientists
 Maurice Allais (1911–2010), Nobel Prize in Economics, 1988
 Léon Walras (1834–1910), mathematical economist
 Georges Charpak (1924–2010), Nobel Prize in Physics 1992
 Henri Poincaré (1854-1912), mathematician and physicist
 Jean-Baptiste Élie de Beaumont (1798–1874), founder of geology, Wollaston Medal 1843
 Auguste Laurent (1808–1853), chemist, precursor of Organic Chemistry modern
 Alfred-Marie Liénard (1869–1958), famous for the Liénard–Wiechert potential
 Louis Paul Cailletet (1832–1913), physicist and inventor
 Jean-Jacques Favier (1949–), astronaut
 Marie-Adolphe Carnot, (1839-1920), French chemist, mining engineer and politician, having uranium ore carnotite named after him.
 Sylvaine Neveu (born 1968), chemist and scientific director of the Solvay group

Business leaders 
 Odile Hembise Fanton d’Andon. CEO of the ACRI-ST (since 2000)
 Anne Rigail, CEO of Air France (since 2018) 
 Patrick Pouyanné, CEO of TotalEnergies (since 2014)
 Jacques Aschenbroich, CEO of Valeo (since 2009)
 Jean-Laurent Bonnafé, CEO of BNP Paribas (since 2011)
 Tidjane Thiam, CEO of Credit Suisse (2015-2020)
 Carlos Ghosn, CEO of Nissan (2001-2018) and CEO of Renault-Nissan (2005-2018)
 Anne Lauvergeon, CEO of Areva (2001-2011)
 Thierry Desmarest, CEO of Total (1995-2010)
 Didier Lombard, CEO of France Télécom (2005-2010)
 Jean-Louis Beffa, CEO of Saint-Gobain (1986-2007)
 Jean-Martin Folz, CEO of PSA Peugeot Citroën (1995-2007)
 Denis Ranque, CEO of Thales Group (1998-2009)
 Noël Forgeard, former CEO of Airbus (1998-2005) and EADS (2005-2006)
 Francis Mer, CEO of Usinor (1986-2001) and former Minister of Finances of France (2002-2004)
 Eckley Brinton Coxe (1839-1895), Owner Coxe Brothers and Company, Pennsylvania State Senator

Entrepreneurs
 Franck Le Ouay and Romain Nicolli, co-founders of Criteo

Politicians
 Alain Poher (1909–1996), politician, president of Sénat, president by interim of French Republic.
 Jean-Louis Bianco (1943–), General Secretary of President of France (1982–1991), Minister of Social Affairs (France) (1991–1992), Minister of Transport (France) (1992–1993), députy of Alpes de Haute Provence's 1st constituency (1997–)
 Charles de Freycinet, prime minister of France at the end of the 19th century
 Albert François Lebrun (1871–1950), president of France
 Najla Bouden Romdhane (1958–), designated prime minister of Tunisia (2021–)

Research centres

Energy and Processes

 CES (Energy efficiency of Systems Center)
 CTP (Thermodynamics of Processes Center)
 OIE (Observation, Impacts, Energy Center)
 PERSEE (Processes, Renewable Energies and Energy Systems Center)

Mathematics and Systems

 CAOR (Robotics Center)
 CAS (Automatic Control and Systems Center)
 CBIO (Computational Biology Center)
 CMA (Applied Mathematics Center)
 CMM (Mathematical Morphology Center)
 CRI (Computer Science Center)

Earth Science and Environment

 Geosciences (Geosciences and Geoengineering Center). Located in Fontainebleau, the Geosciences and Geoengineering Department (a research structure common to MINES ParisTech and ARMINES) focuses on research and teaching activities in the field of Earth and Environmental Sciences. 
 ISIGE (Environmental Engineering and Management Center)

Economics, Management, Society

 CERNA (Industrial Economics Center)
 CGS (Scientific Management Center)
 CRC (Crisis and Risk Research Center)
 CSI (Sociology of Innovation Center)

Mechanical and Materials Engineering

 CEMEF (Material Forming Center)
 Materials Center

Source:

Other schools of Mines in France
 École nationale supérieure des Mines d'Albi Carmaux (Mines Albi-Carmaux)
 École nationale supérieure des Mines d'Alès (Mines Alès)
 École nationale supérieure des Mines de Douai (Mines Douai)
 École nationale supérieure des Mines de Nancy
 École nationale supérieure des Mines de Nantes (Mines Nantes)
 École nationale supérieure des mines de Saint-Étienne (Mines Saint-Étienne)

Other schools of Mines in the UK
 Royal School of Mines

Other schools of Mines in Africa
 École nationale supérieure des Mines de Rabat (Mines Rabat)

Other schools of Mines in the USA
 Colorado School of Mines
 Columbia School of Mines

See also
PSL Research University
 ParisTech
 Institut Mines-Télécom
 École des mines d'Albi-Carmaux
 École des mines d'Alès
 École des mines de Douai
 École des mines de Nantes
 École nationale supérieure des mines de Nancy
 École nationale supérieure des mines de Saint-Étienne
 École Nationale Supérieure des Mines de Rabat
 Musée de Minéralogie
 Télécom SudParis
 Mines ParisTech: Professional Ranking of World Universities

Notes and references

External links

 School's official Web Portal
 School's Linkedin page
 Students' Web Portal
ISIGE – Mines ParisTech's faculty of Sustainable development

ParisTech
Schools of mines
Universities and colleges in Paris
Buildings and structures in the 6th arrondissement of Paris
Engineering universities and colleges in France
Grandes écoles
Technical universities and colleges in France
1783 establishments in France
Educational institutions established in 1783